Lisnagarvey Hockey Club is a field hockey club based in Hillsborough, County Down, Northern Ireland. The club was founded in 1901 and was originally based in Lisburn. The club was named after Lisnagarvey, the townland that eventually expanded into Lisburn. The club's senior men's team plays in the Men's Irish Hockey League, the Men's Irish Senior Cup, the Kirk Cup and the Anderson Cup. They have previously played in the Ulster Senior League. The men's reserve team plays in the Men's Irish Junior Cup. Lisnagarvey has also represented Ireland in European competitions, winning the 1991 EuroHockey Club Trophy. Lisnagarvey also fields various men's and women's teams in junior, senior and veterans leagues and cup competitions affiliated to the Ulster Hockey Union.

History

Early years
Lisnagarvey Hockey Club was founded in September 1901, following a meeting held at the Temperance Institute on Railway Street, Lisburn. An earlier Lisburn Hockey Club was founded in 1897 so the new club was named after Lisnagarvey, the townland that eventually expanded into Lisburn. In 1903–04 the club joined a league for the first time and in 1904–05 the club won its first trophy, the Mulholland Shield. In 1905–06 Lisnagarvey reached the final of the Irish Junior Cup. After the first game against Monkstown finished 2–2 after extra time, they lost the replay 5–0. In 1922–23 Lisnagarvey won their first senior trophy when they won the Anderson Cup, defeating Antrim in the final. In 1924–25 Lisnagarvey won a quartet of trophies. In addition to winning the Anderson Cup for a second time, they also won the Irish Senior Cup, the Kirk Cup and the Ulster Senior League, all for the first time.

Men's Irish Senior Cup
Lisnagarvey are the Irish Senior Cup's most successful team. They won the cup for the first time in 1924–25, defeating Limerick PMYA over three games. Between 1987–88 and 1993–94 with a team that included Jimmy Kirkwood, Lisnagarvey won the cup for seven successive seasons.

Notes

Ulster Senior League

Men's Irish Junior Cup
In 1905–06 Lisnagarvey reached the final of the Irish Junior Cup for the first time. After the first game against Monkstown finished 2–2 after extra time, they lost the replay 5–0. In 1954–55 Lisnagarvey won the Irish Junior Cup for the first time after defeating UCD 4–0 in the final.

Notes

Kirk Cup

Notes

Anderson Cup

Notes

Men's Irish Hockey League
In 2008–09 Lisnagarvey were founder members of the Men's Irish Hockey League.

Regular season

Notes

EY Champions Trophy

Lisnagarvey in Europe
Lisnagarvey has also represented Ireland in European competitions. After winning both the 1969–70 Irish Senior Cup and the 1969–70 British Club Championship, Lisnagarvey were invited to play in the 1971 EuroHockey Club Champions Cup. After retaining both the Irish Senior Cup and the British Club Championship in 1970–71, Lisnagarvey were invited to play in the 1972 EuroHockey Club Champions Cup.

Women's section
Lisnagarvey first formed a women's section in 1903–04. The original women's section was suspended during the First World War but was reformed in 1920. During the 1920s at least two Lisnagarvey women's players – Sylvia Kirkwood and K. Kirkwood – represented Ireland.

Women's Irish Junior Cup

Grounds

Lisnagarvey originally played their home games at two separate pitches in Lisburn – one at Magheralave Road and the other at Antrim Road. Lisnagarvey took over the Magheralave Road pitch from the original Lisburn Hockey Club after it disbanded around 1907–08. They continued to use this pitch until 1933–34. In the early 1950s Lisnagarvey purchased ground in Blaris, near the Lisnagarvey transmitting station. The club members subsequently built their own pitch and pavilion. In the 1980s the club established an artificial pitch complex at a completely new venue nearby. The new home was named New Blaris. 
In 2002 New Blaris was sold and the club temporarily played its home games at Queen's University. Work on a new home at Comber Road, Hillsborough, County Down was started in 2004. This facility featuring a new clubhouse and two water-based artificial turf pitches was completed in time for the start of the 2005–06 season.

Notable players

Men's field hockey internationals
In 1908 Fred Hull became the first Lisnagarvey player to play for Ireland. He made his debut as a substitute in a match against Wales.

 

 Steven Johnson 
 Jimmy Kirkwood
 Stephen Martin

men's cricket internationals
 Jack Bowden
 Jimmy Kirkwood
 Nelson Russell

Women's field hockey internationals

 K. Kirkwood
 Sylvia Kirkwood

Recipients of the Military Cross
During the First World War forty-three club members served with the British Armed Forces. Of these four were killed and four were wounded. Four others received the Military Cross.

 E. B. B. Hamilton
 R. P. McGregor
 Hugh Morrow
 Nelson Russell

Honours

Men
EuroHockey Club Trophy
Winners: 1991: 1
Runners Up: 1989: 1
British Club Championship
Winners: 1969–70, 1970–71: 2 
Men's Irish Hockey League
Winners: 2011–12, 2015–16, 2018–19, 2021-22: 4
Runners Up: 2009–10, 2010–11: 2
Irish Senior Cup
Winners: 1924–25, 1926–27, 1940–41, 1944–45, 1945–46, 1950–51, 1951–52, 1957–58, 1959–60, 1961–62, 1965–66, 1969–70, 1970–71, 1987–88, 1988–89, 1989–90, 1990–91, 1991–92, 1992–93, 1993–94, 1996–97, 2002–03, 2004–05, 2019-20, 2021-22: 25   
Runners Up: 1942–43, 1948–49, 1958–59, 1977–78, 1980–81, 1995–96, 1999–2000, 2005–06, 2015–16, 2018–19: 10
Irish Junior Cup
Winners: 1954–55, 1955–56, 1957–58, 1958–59, 1959–60, 1961–62, 1962–63, 1966–67, 1969–70, 1971–72, 1972–73, 1973–74, 1976–77, 1986–87, 1989–90, 2002–03, 2010–11: 17 
Runners Up: 1905–06, 1953–54, 1974–75, 1988–89, 1992–93, 1998–99, 2000–01, 2003–04: 8
EY Champions Trophy
Winners: 2015-16, 2021-22: 2
Runners Up: 2019: 1
Ulster Senior League
Winners: 1924–25, 1933–34, 1937–38, 1938–39, 1944–45, 1949–50, 1950–51, 1951–52, 1952–53, 1953–54, 1954–55, 1959–60, 1960–61, 1962–63, 1964–65, 1965–66, 1969–70, 1971–72, 1976–77, 1977–78, 1980–81, 1989–90, 1990–91, 1991–92, 1993–94, 1994–95, 1996–97, 1998–99, 1999–2000, 2000–01, 2001–02, 2010–11: 32
Kirk Cup
Winners: 1922–23, 1923–24, 1924–25, 1933–34, 1938–39, 1941–42, 1942–43, 1944–45, 1945–46, 1947–48, 1952–53, 1953–54, 1955–56, 1960–61, 1961–62, 1963–64, 1970–71, 1972–73, 1973–74, 1977–78, 1979–80, 1981–82, 1989–90, 1994–95, 1995–96, 1996–97, 1997–98, 1998–99, 2000–01, 2001–02, 2011–12: 31 
Runners Up: 1936–37, 1948–49, 1965–66, 1974–75, 1983–84, 1984–85, 1990–91, 1991–92, 1999–2000, 2004–05, 2006–07, 2007–08, 2008–09, 2012–13, 2013–14: 15
Anderson Cup
Winners: 1922–23, 1924–25, 1933–34, 1934–35, 1937–38, 1942–43, 1945–46, 1946–47, 1951–52, 1953–54, 1954–55, 1955–56, 1957–58, 1959–60, 1960–61, 1963–64, 1975–76, 1979–80, 1980–81, 1986–87, 1993–94, 1995–96, 1996–97, 2007–08, 2018–19: 25
Runners Up: 1926–27, 1943–44, 1952–53, 1964–65, 1976–77, 1977–78, 2005–06, 2009–10, 2013–14, 2014–15 : 10

Notes

Women
Irish Junior Cup
Runners Up: 2010–11, 2012–13

References

External links
 Lisnagarvey Hockey Club on Facebook
  Lisnagarvey Hockey Club on Twitter

 
Field hockey clubs in Northern Ireland
Men's Irish Hockey League teams
Sports clubs in County Down
1901 establishments in Ireland
Field hockey clubs established in 1901
Civil parish of Hillsborough, County Down